Mark Léster Blanco Pineda (born January 17, 1989 in Soyapango, El Salvador) is a Salvadoran professional footballer who plays as a forward for Thai League 3 club North Bangkok University.

Club career
Blanco came through the youth ranks at the Fútbol Blanco Sport, and made his debut at Second Division side Atlético Marte in 2004. After a year and another at Telecom, he joined Nejapa and later moved on to Chalatenango on loan before returning to Atlético Marte. He joined Isidro Metapán for the Clausura 2010.

Blanco was crucial in the Clausura 2010 final of the Primera División de Fútbol de El Salvador, when he scored two of the three goals to give Isidro Metapán their fourth title in its history.

He was on a trial with Norwegian club Kongsvinger in January 2012, and the club wanted to sign Blanco. However, nothing happened until the Norwegian transfer window closed on 31 March, but Kongsvinger announced on 30 May that Blanco would join them on loan from 1 August until the end of the season in November. The club was close to bankruptcy and was not able to sign Lester on a permanent deal.

On January 2, he signed for a season loan with Real Madrid. He spent the 2012–13 clasura with them.

After he signed another loan deal with Real España. He returned to El Salvador to sign with Luis Ángel Firpo at the end of the season. In July 2014, Blanco signed with FAS for the Apertura 2014.

International career
Blanco made his debut for El Salvador in an October 2007 friendly match against Costa Rica.

Léster Blanco scored his first goal with El Salvador on March 29, 2011, in a 2–3 loss against Jamaica.

Léster Blanco played in the "2011 CONCACAF Gold Cup Tournament" and scored one goal in that event, in a 6–1 victory against Cuba.

On October 7, 2011 Léster Blanco scored a goal that led to a 2–1 victory against Dominican Republic. On November 2, Léster Blanco scored two goals in Suriname's home territory, giving the salvadorans a 1–3 victory.

On March 24, 2012 Léster Blanco scored a goal in an Under 23 victory 4–0 match against Cuba in minute '4 in the game. Léster Blanco scored against USA in an Under 23 match, leaving USA eliminated in the Pre-olympic tournament.

Honors

Club
Santa Tecla
Primera División de Fútbol de El Salvador (La Primera) Winner (1): Apertura 2016

Metapan
La Primera Winner (2): Clausura 2010, Apertura 2010

Real C.D. España
Liga Nacional de Honduras Winner (1): Apertura 2013

References

External links
 Mark Léster Blanco at Soccerway 
 

1989 births
Living people
People from San Salvador Department
Salvadoran footballers
El Salvador international footballers
Norwegian First Division players
Liga FPD players
Liga Nacional de Fútbol de Guatemala players
Liga Nacional de Fútbol Profesional de Honduras players
C.D. Atlético Marte footballers
Nejapa footballers
C.D. Chalatenango footballers
A.D. Isidro Metapán footballers
Kongsvinger IL Toppfotball players
C.D. Marathón players
Real C.D. España players
C.D. Luis Ángel Firpo footballers
C.D. FAS footballers
Santa Tecla F.C. footballers
A.D. San Carlos footballers
A.D.R. Jicaral players
Lester Blanco
Léster Blanco
2011 Copa Centroamericana players
2011 CONCACAF Gold Cup players
2013 Copa Centroamericana players
2013 CONCACAF Gold Cup players
Salvadoran expatriate footballers
Expatriate footballers in Norway
Expatriate footballers in Honduras
Expatriate footballers in Guatemala
Expatriate footballers in Thailand
Salvadoran expatriate sportspeople in Norway
Salvadoran expatriate sportspeople in Honduras
Salvadoran expatriate sportspeople in Guatemala
Salvadoran expatriate sportspeople in Thailand
Association football forwards